Vito Da Ros (born 31 May 1957) is an Italian former cyclist. He competed in the team time trial event at the 1976 Summer Olympics.

References

External links
 

1957 births
Living people
Italian male cyclists
Olympic cyclists of Italy
Cyclists at the 1976 Summer Olympics
Cyclists from Friuli Venezia Giulia
People from the Province of Pordenone